Portage Municipal Airport  is a city owned public use airport located two nautical miles (4 km) northwest of the central business district of Portage, a city in Columbia County, Wisconsin, United States. It is included in the Federal Aviation Administration (FAA) National Plan of Integrated Airport Systems for 2021–2025, in which it is categorized as a local general aviation facility.

Facilities and aircraft 
Portage Municipal Airport covers an area of 106 acres (43 ha) at an elevation of 824 feet (251 m) above mean sea level. It has two runways with asphalt surfaces: 18/36 is 3,770 by 60 feet (1,149 x 18 m) and 4/22 is 2,668 by 40 feet (813 x 12 m).

For the 12-month period ending June 17, 2020, the airport had 4,750 aircraft operations: 95% general aviation, 4% military and 1% air taxi.
In February 2023, there were 22 aircraft based at this airport: all 22 single-engine.

See also 
 List of airports in Wisconsin

References

External links 
 Air Portage Inc., the fixed-base operator (FBO)
  at Wisconsin DOT Airport Directory
 

Airports in Wisconsin
Buildings and structures in Columbia County, Wisconsin